The Order of Otan (Kazakh: Отан ордені, trans. Otan ordeni, Order of the Fatherland) is one of the highest orders of the Republic of Kazakhstan.
The order is usually awarded to citizens for the following, but there have been several notable non-citizen recipients.
 Outstanding achievements in public and social activities
 Development of economy, social sphere, science and culture
 State, law enforcement and military service
 Development of democracy and social progress
A commemorative 50 tenge coin featuring the medallion of the award on the reverse side was issued in 2007.

Notable recipients
 Nursultan Nazarbayev
 Kassym-Jomart Tokayev
 Qairat Rysqulbekov
 Sagadat Nurmagambetov
 Kanat Saudabayev
 Khiuaz Dospanova
 Toktar Aubakirov
 Talgat Musabayev
 Roza Baglanova
 Shafik Chokin
 Mukhtar Altynbayev
 Yuri Malenchenko

See also
Orders, decorations, and medals of Kazakhstan

References

Orders, decorations, and medals of Kazakhstan